Steven John Richardson (born 24 July 1966) is an English professional golfer.

Richardson was born in Windsor, Berkshire. He won the English Amateur in 1989 and turned professional later that year. He made a strong start to his professional career, finishing in 29th place on the European Tour Order of Merit in his rookie season. The following year he won the Girona Open and the Portuguese Open, tied for 5th in the USPGA Championship, and finished second on the Order of Merit to Seve Ballesteros. He also ended the 1992 and 1993 seasons inside the top 20 on the money list, while picking up his third career victory in the Mercedes German Masters.

However Richardson's form began to decline, as he slipped outside the top 50 on the European Tour Order of Merit in 1994. He fell outside the top 100 two years later, and had to visit qualifying school in 1998, 1999 and 2000 to regain his tour card. He finally lost his place on the European Tour at the end of 2001 having failed to come through the qualifying school by a single shot. He revisited qualifying the following year, but was again unsuccessful.

Richardson was a member of Europe's losing Ryder Cup team in 1991. He won two points in partnership with Mark James but lost his singles match to Corey Pavin. In 1992 he was a member of the winning English team at the Alfred Dunhill Cup.

Amateur wins
1989 English Amateur

Professional wins (3)

European Tour wins (3)

Results in major championships

CUT = missed the half-way cut
"T" = tied

Summary

Most consecutive cuts made – 3 (1991 Open Championship – 1992 Masters)
Longest streak of top-10s – 1

Professional team appearances
Dunhill Cup (representing England): 1991, 1992 (winners)
Four Tours World Championship (representing Europe): 1991 (winners)
Ryder Cup (representing Europe): 1991
World Cup (representing England): 1991, 1992

References

External links

English male golfers
European Tour golfers
Ryder Cup competitors for Europe
Sportspeople from Windsor, Berkshire
People from Havant
1966 births
Living people